Sam Esmail (born September 17, 1977) is an American film and television producer, director, and screenwriter who runs the production company Esmail Corp. He is best known as the creator, writer and director of the award-winning USA Network television series Mr. Robot (2015–2019), starring Rami Malek. He also wrote and directed the feature film Comet (2014). He directed and produced the acclaimed Amazon Prime Video psychological thriller Homecoming (2018–2020), starring Julia Roberts and Janelle Monáe, and produced USA's Briarpatch (2020), Starz's Gaslit (2022), and Peacock's Angelyne (2022) and The Resort (2022). As of 2023, Esmail is attached to produce a number of upcoming television series and films, including Metropolis (a miniseries adaptation of the 1927 silent film), and the film Leave the World Behind—both for which he also serves as director and writer—and a new Battlestar Galactica television series to serve as a soft reboot of the 2004 show's universe.

Esmail's work often centers on the themes of alienation, technology, and American society, and he is known to work with cinematographer Tod Campbell and producer Chad Hamilton of Anonymous Content.

Early life
Esmail was born to Egyptian immigrant parents in Hoboken, New Jersey. He has an older sister and two younger brothers, including Samer Esmail who was a post-production coordinator for Mr. Robot and Homecoming. His family is Muslim.

When he was five years old, his family moved to South Carolina and then to Charlotte, North Carolina. As a kid, Esmail was very interested in technology. He acquired his first computer when he was nine and began computer programming a few years later. He attended high school in Summerville, South Carolina, where he said, "I used to hold Stanley Kubrick film festivals at my house in high school. These are not cool things. Back in my day, those are things that you would get beaten up for," adding, "When you're a funny-looking Egyptian growing up in Jersey and South Carolina, it kind of gets rough." The family eventually moved back to Sewell, New Jersey, where Esmail graduated from Washington Township High School in 1995.

Esmail attended New York University where he studied film and computer science. He graduated in 1998 from the university's Tisch School of the Arts. While attending the school, Esmail worked in its computer lab before being put on academic probation for hacking emails there.

After graduating he briefly worked for an internet start-up, before founding his own ISP software company called Portal Vision. At age 20, he raised US$6 million in venture capital funding during the dot-com boom but the software quickly became outdated when broadband internet began replacing dial-up. He left his position as president and chief technology officer to briefly attend Dartmouth College's creative writing program.

Esmail moved to Los Angeles in 2001 where he attended the AFI Conservatory. He graduated with a Master of Fine Arts in directing in 2004.

Career

2004–2014: Early career and Comet 
After graduating the AFI Conservatory in 2004, Esmail struggled to find work and held odd jobs. He worked as an assistant Film editor for a few years and was eventually able to establish a career as a post-production supervisor of behind-the-scenes features and television specials; his work included helping to edit episodes of reality television shows for Lifetime and A&E and stand-up specials for Comedy Central, HBO's documentary series Tourgasm and HBO First Look, and "the making of" features for The Fast and the Furious franchise, as well as supervise the 2010 A&E documentary The Battle for Late Night.

When not working as a full-time editor, Esmail worked on writing screenplays. Frustrated with his career, Hollywood, and its films, Esmail began writing his own feature films. His screenplay, Sequels, Remakes & Adaptations landed on 2008's Black List, a yearly survey of over six hundred production companies and film executives of the "most liked" motion picture screenplays not yet produced. After this, he was able to find representation in Hollywood and began working more as a screenwriter; he wrote another screenplay that also landed on the Black List the following year and co-wrote the horror film Mockingbird with writer Bryan Bertino, which was released in 2014.

He wrote seriously for years before stopping to focus on his passion, directing. He began writing his own feature-length directorial debut, Comet, which was released by IFC Films in 2014. Comet premiered at the Los Angeles Film Festival and had a limited box office release.

2014–present: Mr. Robot and prestige television

Mr. Robot 
Originally intending it as a follow-up feature film to Comet, Esmail began working on the technological thriller Mr. Robot in the late 2000s, inspired in part by the 2008 financial crisis and the Arab Spring. He has said that the main character, Elliot, is a "thinly-veiled version" of himself; like Elliot, Esmail also suffers from social anxiety and is from Washington Township in New Jersey. He was later inspired to take what he had written and create a pilot for what he imagined would be a four-or-five season show. He shopped his projects around to many different television networks and began developing the show with USA Network in 2014.

Mr. Robot premiered on the USA Network on June 24, 2015. Esmail is the creator, executive producer and head writer of the series. Beginning with season two, Esmail also directed all episodes of the show; in total he directed thirty-eight of its forty-five episodes. The first season of the show was critically acclaimed and Esmail himself was nominated for two Emmys, among other awards. The following three seasons of the show premiered in July 2016, October 2017, and October 2019, respectively.

In a 2015 interview, Esmail explained the influence of his experiences as a first-generation American on his work, saying, "I tend to write about alienated figures who can't connect with others and who are kind of distant from American culture. It's not something I am consciously doing but it's something that happens to be infused inside me because of my experience growing up in America."

Esmail Corp and television production 
Following the wide recognition of Mr. Robot, Esmail formed his own production company, Esmail Corp. In early 2017, Esmail was called on by Universal Pictures to produce a film centered around the Bermuda Triangle, but production has since not been carried through.

Esmail was one of the executive producers and director of the Amazon Video series Homecoming, starring Julia Roberts and Bobby Cannavale. He received strong reviews for his direction of the show, which premiered in November 2018. In 2018, Esmail worked on creating the television show Briarpatch with journalist and producer Andy Greenwald, who previously hosted the Mr. Robot aftershow Hacking Robot on USA. The show, which Esmail executive produced, was picked up by USA Network in 2019. The show was released in 2020 as well as the second season of Homecoming.

Partnership with Universal Content Productions

In February 2019, it was announced that Esmail had signed his company to a four-year exclusive deal with Universal Content Productions with whom he had already produced Mr. Robot, Homecoming, and Briarpatch. Following this announcement, a number of projects in development were announced which would be sold and produced in the following few years.

In 2019, it was announced that Esmail was developing a limited series with Emmy Rossum for the NBCUniversal streaming service Peacock based on the Los Angeles pseudo-celebrity Angelyne. Produced during the first half of 2020, Angelyne was ultimately released May 19, 2022.

In September 2020, Esmail sold two dramas to ABC; in January 2021, a pilot was ordered for the first of those shows, Acts of Crime, but was not picked up by the network.

In February 2020, it was also announced that Esmail would be producing a new television series with Homecoming collaborator Julia Roberts based on the Slow Burn podcast's coverage of the Watergate scandal. Titled Gaslit, production began in Spring 2021 and it premiered on Starz in April 2022. Also in 2020, it was announced that Esmail will direct a film adaptation of the novel Leave the World Behind for Netflix with Roberts. Production began in April 2022, at which time it was announced that the Obamas’ Higher Ground Productions had joined the project as producers.

In June 2021, it was announced that Peacock had picked up The Resort, a darkly comedic television series which features true crime stories that took place at resorts. First announced in 2020, Esmail, who serves as executive producer, developed the project with screenwriter Andy Siara. The eight episode series went into production in 2022.

In March 2022, Apple ordered to series the television adaptation of the 1927 sci-fi classic Metropolis, to be written, directed, and produced by Esmail. The project was first revealed in 2016.

In development 
Since 2018, Esmail has been developing a film with Universal Pictures and Mr. Robot star Rami Malek based on the memoir American Radical: Inside the World of an Undercover Muslim FBI Agent by Tamer Elnoury and Kevin Maurer; the story centers on a Muslim FBI agent working for the agency post-9/11. Two years following the initial announcement, in September 2020, it was announced that screenwriter Nazrin Choudhury is attached to pen the film. As of 2019, Esmail and Malek were also working together on another undisclosed project.

In February 2020, it was announced that Esmail would develop one of the initial projects for Condé Nast's new Wired Studio; called Tell Tale Heart, his film is based on the 2019 Wired article of the same name. He began developing television series The American Throne with director Julius Onah in 2021. Esmail is also developing a series for the Battlestar Galactica franchise for NBCU with Michael Lesslie as showrunner. As of 2019, he is also producing a scripted podcast series for the UCP Audio network called This End Up.

Personal life

In August 2015, Esmail became engaged to actress Emmy Rossum after dating for two years. He had directed her in his debut film, Comet. Rossum is of mixed Russian Jewish descent on her mothers side. The two married on May 28, 2017, at a Reform synagogue in New York City. On May 24, 2021, Rossum gave birth to their daughter.

Esmail is fluent in Arabic, notably giving part of his acceptance speech at the Golden Globes in the language.

Esmail suffers from social anxiety disorder and credits his wife Rossum in helping him with it.

Esmail splits his time between New York City and Los Angeles.

Filmography

Film

Television

Accolades

References

External links

 
 

Living people
1977 births
People from Hoboken, New Jersey
American male writers
American directors
American screenwriters
American people of Egyptian descent
American Muslims
American film producers
Tisch School of the Arts alumni
AFI Conservatory alumni
Writers from Hoboken, New Jersey
Television producers from New Jersey
People from Washington Township, Gloucester County, New Jersey
Washington Township High School (New Jersey) alumni